Wolverine is a number of Marvel Comics comic book series starring the X-Men member Wolverine. , 323 issues and 11 annuals have been published. It is the original flagship title created for the character.

Publication history

Volume 1

The first Wolverine was a four issue limited series (the company's second-ever limited series), written by Chris Claremont with pencils by Frank Miller, inks by Joe Rubinstein, letters by Tom Orzechowski, and colors by Glynis Wein. Marvel Comics published the series in 1982, cover dated from September to December. Highlighting Wolverine's time in Japan, this story arc covers his battle with the yakuza, The Hand ninja organization, and his engagement to Mariko Yashida.

Volume 2
An ongoing series started publication in 1988 and lasted until 2003 when it was relaunched after issue #189. The original creative team consisted of writer Chris Claremont and penciler John Buscema. Claremont described the series as "high adventure rather than super heroics, sort of a combination of Conan meets Terry and the Pirates." As a visual manifestation of the series' break from the traditional superhero genre, throughout Claremont's run, Wolverine wears either civilian clothes or a mask-less, all-black outfit instead of his superhero costume. Costumed characters in general were few and far between. 

The second volume carries ties to both the "Apocalypse: The Twelve" and the "Ages of Apocalypse" story arcs. The volume is also tied to the "Phalanx Covenant" story arc as well. Nearly half of the volume's run was written by Larry Hama. Other writers on the series included Peter David, Archie Goodwin, Jo Duffy, Warren Ellis, Todd Dezago, Erik Larsen, Steve Skroce, Rob Liefeld, Frank Tieri, Matt Nixon and Daniel Way. Marc Silvestri penciled Wolverine from 1990 to 1992.

Volume 3
Volume 3 shares large ties to the "House of M", "Decimation", and "Civil War" story arcs, which made a large impact to the Marvel universe. The alternate timeline "Old Man Logan" story arc is also prominent in the third volume as well. 
Volume 3 is also notable for beginning of the Wolverine: Origins story, which introduces Wolverine's son, Daken. And as part of the "Dark Reign" storyline, the series was renamed Dark Wolverine in 2009 with issue #75 giving more focus on Daken. The third volume began in July 2003, and ended in August 2009 with issue #90. The volume was primarily written by Daniel Way.

Volume 4
A fourth volume was launched in September 2010 with a new #1. Consisting of the "Wolverine Goes to Hell" and "Goodbye Chinatown" story arcs, the fourth volume also carries ties into the X-Men: Regenesis story arc as well.

The fourth volume ended after issue #20, and the series returned to its original ongoing numbering as issue #300. 
How Marvel reached issue #300 is like this: Volume 2 (#1-189), Volume 3 (#1-90/#190-279), and Volume 4 (#1-20/#280-299), with Volume 4's issue #21 ending up as #300.

The fourth volume was primarily written by Jason Aaron, and was concluded with issue #317 in December 2012 in the wake of the Marvel NOW! initiative.

Volume 5
As part of the Marvel NOW! relaunch, Wolverine Vol. 4 was cancelled as of issue #317 and a fifth volume was launched in March 2013, with the creative team of Paul Cornell and Alan Davis. The fifth volume consists of the "Hunting Season" and "Killable" story arcs of Wolverine's life, with a brief run of 13 issues. Volume 5 serves as one of the preludes to the "Death of Wolverine" story arc. 

An additional series titled Savage Wolverine debuted in January 2013. The title features team-ups between Wolverine and Shanna the She-Devil, as they try to survive The Savage Land, and various encounters with other Marvel characters.

Volume 6
A sixth volume of Wolverine by Paul Cornell and Ryan Stegman was launched as part of All-New Marvel NOW! initiative in February 2014, featuring a changed Wolverine, who has joined a group of minor supervillains as an attempt to simplify his life. Consisting of the "Three Months to Die" story arc, the sixth volume ran for thirteen issues, and also served as a prelude to the "Death of Wolverine" story arc.

Volume 7
The seventh volume of Wolverine was released as part of the Dawn of X, Reign of X, and Destiny of X relaunches. The first two relaunches took place in the year of 2020, being overseen by Jonathan Hickman. The volume is written by Benjamin Percy and illustrated by Adam Kubert. The sixth and seventh issues are the tie-ins to the "X of Swords" crossover storyline of Dawn of X, while issues #8–19 are connected to the "Hellfire Gala" crossover storyline in the Reign of X relaunch. Issue #20 ties into the "X Lives of Wolverine and X Deaths of Wolverine" story event, along with the Destiny of X relaunch that will follows the event.
Issues 24-25 tie into the "Judgement Day" crossover event.

Prints

In other media

Film 

 The story arc from Volume 1 concerning Logan's exploits in Japan has been loosely adapted into the 2013 live-action film, The Wolverine, directed by James Mangold and starring Hugh Jackman as Logan, with Tao Okamoto, Hiroyuki Sanada and Rila Fukushima, being the sixth installment to the X-Men film series.
 The out-of-continuity "Old Man Logan" storyline from the solo title's third volume served as the primary inspiration for the live-action film Logan (2017), again directed by Mangold and starring Jackman in the title role. However, the film's adaptation of the narrative is loose, removing plot elements such as the conquering of the world by various supervillains and repurposing an ailing Charles Xavier in the support role originally occupied by Clint Barton/Hawkeye in the source material.

Reception
IGN gave the trade paperback collection of the first Wolverine series a "Must Have" rating.

Collected editions
List of Wolverine collected editions.

References

External links

1982 comics debuts
1982 establishments in the United States
1983 comics debuts
2003 comics debuts
Comics by Archie Goodwin (comics)
Comics by Chris Claremont
Wolverine (comics) titles